The Zofiówka coal mine is a large mine in the south of Poland in Jastrzębie-Zdrój, Silesian Voivodeship, 307 km south-west of the capital, Warsaw. Zofiówka represents one of the largest coal reserve in Poland having estimated reserves of 87 million tonnes of coal. The annual coal production is around 3.7 million tonnes.

Accidents
 5 miners died in 5 May 2018 due to Rockburst with seismic bump with 3,4 magnitude. 
 10 miners died in 23 April 2022 due to Rockburst with outburst of methane gas.

References

External links 
 Official site

Coal mines in Poland
Buildings and structures in Jastrzębie-Zdrój
Coal mines in Silesian Voivodeship